D78 may refer to:

D. 78, Aria "Son fra l’onde" for soprano and piano, composed by Franz Schubert in 1813
HMS Archer (D78), Long Island-class escort carrier built by the US in 1939–1940, operated by the Royal Navy during World War II
HMS Vidette (D78), Admiralty V class destroyer of the Royal Navy
HMS Wolverine (D78), Admiralty modified W class destroyer built for the Royal Navy
London Underground D78 Stock, type of sub-surface rolling stock which operated on the District line of the London Underground